MTV Indonesia Movie Awards (or MIMA) is an awards show in Indonesia which were established in 1995. The show is based on the US MTV Movie Awards format celebrating local film and actors.

Host Cities

Categories
The categories are divided into "Most Favourite" and "Best" subcategories. Among the categories is also a "Lifetime Achievement Award".

Most Favourite
Most Favourite Movie
Most Favourite Actor
Most Favorite Actress
Most Favourite Supporting Actor
Most Favourite Supporting Actress
Most Favourite Heart Meltin。g Moment
Most Favourite Rising Star

Best
Best Movie
Best Director
Best Crying Secene
Best Song in the Movie
Best Scary Scene
Best Running Scene

Award winners

See also
Cinema of Indonesia

References

External links
MTV Asia Official Site

Indonesian film awards